Bio's Bahnhof (Bio's station) was a music talk show presented by Alfred Biolek on German television from 1978 to 1982. It was produced live with performers of a wide range of music genres in a former railroad depot. Biolek was awarded the Adolf-Grimme-Preis in gold for the series in 1983.

Program 

Alfred Biolek tried a new concept in Bio's Bahnhof, which he conceived for the broadcaster WDR in Cologne: a mix of music genres, and an unusual setting in a former industrial site.

The central idea of Bio's Bahnhof was a mix of many music genres, including pop music, hunting ensemble, classical music and contemporary music such as Karlheinz Stockhausen and Mauricio Kagel. Biolek talked with composers and performers, meeting many representatives of the different styles.

Kate Bush made her first television appearance in the first issue of Bio's Bahnhof. The show also presented dance ensembles, but rarely as they were expensive, compared to individual performers. Sammy Davis, Jr. was available for only 5,000 DM, because Fritz Rau used the appearance as advertisement for his tours. Stars were encouraged to present something unusual, for example a duet of two artists who normally don't perform together; in 1979 Adriano Celentano sang a duet with Elke Sommer, Angelo Branduardi with Esther Ofarim, in 1980 Udo Lindenberg performed with Nana Mouskouri, and in 1982 Mario Adorf with Milva. The American Helen Schneider performed the German traditional "Heidenröslein" in 1978. Biolek, as amateur, sometimes performed with his guest, dancing with Hazy Osterwald and the Kessler-Zwillinge, singing with Caterina Valente and participating in a "clowns" act.

Each show was meant to present one humorous entry, such as comedian Emil Steinberger. The group Folies Parisiennes, of men dressed like Mireille Mathieu and presenting her song "Akropolis Adieu", had to come a second time by popular demand.

In 1982, Biolek decided that he had experimented in enough fields in the show, and wanted to try something else. A later sequel was named  (At Bio's). Ten years after the last show, a special edition was aired on 2 October 1992  from the roundhouse of the former producer of locomotives, Orenstein & Koppel in Babelsberg.

Awards 

In 1983, Biolek was awarded the Adolf-Grimme-Preis in gold for the series.

Episodes

Further reading 
 Norbert Thomas: Alfred Biolek und sein Bahnhof. (in German) Bertelsmann, München 1982,

Documentation 
 Bahnhof für Bio – Alfred Biolek wird 70. Documentation about the series Bio's Bahnhof with excerpts from the shows and interviews with Biolek, 2004, 100 min., book and direction: , moderation: Anke Engelke and Hape Kerkeling, first aired on 10 July 2004 by WDR and NDR

References

External links 
 

German music television series